"So High" is a song by American rapper Slim Thug, released on September 30, 2010, as the second single from his third studio album, Tha Thug Show (2010). The song, produced by Nard & B, features vocals from fellow American rapper B.o.B.

Background 
"So High" has been called an unlikely collaboration multiple times being between a hardcore Texas rapper in Slim Thug and hip hop, rock crossover artist in B.o.B.

Music video 
The music video which is directed by Parris debuted on VEVO on October 21, 2010.

Critical reception 
The song has been described as a radio friendly single. Rapreviews.com praised B.o.B's guest spot on the song.

Track listing 
 iTunes single digital download
 "So High"(featuring B.o. B) - 3:58

Charts

Release history

References 

2010 singles
2010 songs
Slim Thug songs
B.o.B songs
Songs written by B.o.B
Song recordings produced by Nard & B
MNRK Music Group singles